The Janjaweed (also transliterated Janjawid) are a Sudanese Arab militia group that operate in Sudan, particularly Darfur, and eastern Chad. Using the United Nations definition, the Janjaweed comprise Sudanese Arab tribes, the core of whom are from the Abbala (camel herder) background with significant recruitment from the Baggara (cattle herder) people. This UN definition may not necessarily be accurate, as instances of members from other tribes have been noted.

In the past, they were at odds with Darfur's sedentary population over natural grazing grounds and farmland, as rainfall dwindled and water became scarce. They are currently in conflict with Darfur rebel groups—the Sudan Liberation Movement/Army and the Justice and Equality Movement. Since 2003 they have been one of the main players in the Darfur conflict, which has pitted the largely nomadic  tribes against the sedentary population of the region in a battle over resource and land allocation. As of August 2013, they are affiliated with the Rapid Support Forces (RSF).

Etymology 
The origin of the word Janjaweed is unclear. It has been translated into English as "devils on horseback"  from the Arabic words  jinn "jinn, demon" and  ʾajāwīd "horses". Other sources suggest its origin comes from the Persian word  jangavi, meaning "warrior", or a portmanteau of three words:  jan, after English "gun"; jinn; and ʾajāwīd.

History

In Darfur, a western province of Sudan, Gaddafi supported the creation of the Arab Gathering (Tajammu al-Arabi) of the Islamic Legion, which according to Gérard Prunier was "a militantly racist and pan-Arabist organization which stressed the 'Arab' character of the province." The two organizations shared members and a source of support, and the distinction between the two is often ambiguous.

The nearly continuous cross-border raids that resulted greatly contributed to a separate ethnic conflict within Darfur that killed about 9,000 people between 1985 and 1988.
The Janjaweed leadership has some background in Gaddafi's mercenary forces.

The Janjaweed first appeared in 1988 after Chadian President Hissène Habré, backed by France and the United States, defeated the Libyan army, thereby ending Col. Muammar al-Gaddafi’s territorial designs on Chad. Gaddafi’s Chadian protégé, Acheikh Ibn-Oumar, retreated with his partisan forces to Darfur, where they were hosted by Sheikh Musa Hilal, the newly elevated chief of the Rizeigat Arab tribes of north Darfur. Hilal’s tribesmen had earlier smuggled Libyan weapons to Ibn-Omer’s forces. A French-Chadian incursion destroyed Ibn-Omer’s camp, but his weapons remained with his Mahamid hosts.

Throughout the 1990s, the Janjaweed were Arab partisans, tolerated by the Sudan Government, who pursued local agendas of controlling land. The majority of Darfur’s Arabs, the Baggara confederation, began their presence in the war over grazing territory, and remain involved. In 1999-2000, faced with threats of insurgencies in Western and  Northern Darfur, Khartoum’s security armed the Janjaweed forces.
 
When the insurgency escalated in February 2003, spearheaded by the Sudan Liberation Movement/Army, and the Justice and Equality Movement, the Sudanese Government responded by using the Janjaweed as its main counter-insurgency force. Protracting the forces to attack and recover the rebel held areas of Darfur, the Janjaweed conducted a campaign  targeting rebels in the region of Darfur. The U.S. State Department and others in 2004 named leading Janjaweed commanders, including Musa Hilal as suspected genocide criminals. By early 2006, many Janjaweed had been absorbed into the Sudan Armed Forces including the Popular Defense Forces and Border Guards. Meanwhile, the Janjaweed expanded to include some Arab tribes in eastern Darfur, not historically associated with the original Janjaweed. Chadian Arabs were also increasingly active in seeking to reestablish a political base in Chad, as part of the Unified Forces for a Democratic Change (FUC) coalition.

By October 2007, only the United States' government had declared the Janjaweed killings in Darfur to be genocide, since they had killed an estimated 200,000-400,000 civilians over the previous three years. The UN Security Council called for the Janjaweed to be disarmed. On July 14, 2008, the prosecutor of the International Criminal Court filed genocide charges against Sudanese President Omar al-Bashir, accusing him of masterminding attempts to wipe out African tribes in Darfur with a campaign of murder, rape and deportation using the Janjaweed tribes.

In August 2013, the NISS restructured the group to become the Rapid Support Forces (RSF) to fight against rebel groups in Darfur, South Kordofan, and the Blue Nile states.

Commanders
 
Musa Hilal, who heads a small but powerful Darfurian Arab tribe, is suspected by the US State Department of being a leader of the Janjaweed. The New Yorker quotes him: "I am a tribal leader. ... The government call to arms is carried out through the tribal leaders." He admits recruiting, but denies being in the military chain of command, according to Human Rights Watch.

The following is a United States State Department list of Janjaweed Commanders and Coordinators:
Sheikh Musa Hilal: Janjaweed coordinator and Buffalo Brigade (Liwa el Jamous) commander.
Hamid Dawai: Janjaweed Brigader, Terbeba-Arara-Beida area leader. Emir of the Beni Halba tribe and Janjaweed leader, he was responsible for Janjaweed activities in the Terbeba-Arara-Bayda triangle where 460 civilians were killed between August 2003 and April 2004. He has residences in Geneina and Bayda, Sudan.
Abdullah hanif Abu Shineibat: Habila and Foro Burunga area. Emir of the Beni Halba tribe and Janjaweed leader in the Habila-Murnei area.
Omada Saef: pasiver and Misterei area. Omda of the Awlad Zeid tribe and leader of the Janjaweed from Geneina to Misterei. He has a residence in Geneina.
Omar Babbush: Habila and Fur Burunga area. Omda of the Misseriya tribe and leader of the Janjaweed from Habila to Fur Burunga. He has a residence in Fur Burunga.
Ahmed Dekheir: Murnei area. He is the omda of the Ma’alia tribe and leader of the Janjaweed in Murnei.
Ahmed Abu Kamasha: Kailek area

The following is a United States Congress list of Janjaweed's Coordination and Command Council:
Sukeirtalah: Lieutenant Colonel, Leader of Janjaweed——Geneina
Ahmed Mohammed Haroun: Coordinator——State Minister of Interior
Osman Yusif Kibir: State Governor Darfur
El Tahir Hassan Abboud: NCP
Mohammed Salih Al Sunusi Baraka: Member of the National Assembly
Mohammed Yusif El Tileit: Western Darfur State Minister
Hussein Abdalla Jibril: Major General, Member of the National Assembly

The following is a United States Congress list of Janjaweed Field Command:
Sheikh Musa Hilal: Janjaweed coordinator and Buffalo Brigade (Liwa el Jamous) commander
Hamid Dawai: Janjaweed Brigadier, Terbeba-Arara-Beida area leader. Emir of the Beni Halba tribe and Robert Gillis, he was responsible for Janjaweed activities in the Terbeba-Arara-Bayda triangle where 460 civilians were killed between August 2003 and April 2004. He has residences in Geneina and Bayda, Sudan.
Abdel Wahid: Janjaweed Brigadier, Kebkabiya area
Mohammed Ibrahim Ginesto: Janjaweed Brigadier
Hussein Tangos: Janjaweed Major
Omer Baabas: Janjaweed Major
International Criminal Court 
Other members:
 Ali Kushayb: Former senior member of the Janjaweed. Kushayb voluntarily surrendered himself for arrest in the Central African Republic in June 2020 and was in ICC custody on 9 June 2020.

References

External links

 "Darfur Documents Confirm Government Policy of Militia Support", Human Rights Watch July 20, 2004
 "Painful legacy of Darfur's horrors: Children born of rape" by Lydia Polgreen, International Herald Tribune, February 12, 2005
 "Who Are the Janjaweed? A guide to the Sudanese militiamen" by Brendan I. Koerner, Slate, July 19, 2005
   by Alex de Waal, SSRC and GEI, Harvard, undated

War in Darfur
Chadian Civil War (2005–2010)
Central African Republic Bush War
Paramilitary organisations based in Sudan
Politics of Sudan
Rebel groups in Sudan
Rebel groups in Chad
Arab nationalism in Sudan